The Oil Prince (German: Der Ölprinz) is a 1965 West German-Yugoslav western film directed by Harald Philipp and starring Stewart Granger, Pierre Brice and Harald Leipnitz. It was also known as Rampage at Apache Wells. The screenplay is based on a novel by Karl May and was one of a series of film adaptations of his work made by Rialto Film.

The film was shot at the Spandau Studios in Berlin and on location in Yugoslavia. The film's sets were designed by the art director Dusan Jericevic.

It recorded admissions of 409,817 in France, 1,449,558 in Spain, and over 3 million in Germany.

Cast 
 Stewart Granger as Old Surehand
 Pierre Brice as Winnetou
 Harald Leipnitz as The Oil Prince
 Macha Méril as Lizzy
 Terence Hill as Richard Forsythe
 Walt Barnes as Bill Campbell
 Antje Weisgerber as Mrs. Ebersbach
 Heinz Erhardt as Cantor Hampel
 Milan Srdoč as Old Wabble
 Gerd Frickhöffer as Kovacz
 Veljko Maričić as Bergmann
 Dušan Janićijević as Butler
 Slobodan Dimitrijević as Knife
 Davor Antolić as Paddy
 Zvonimir Črnko as Billy Forner

References

Bibliography 
 Bergfelder, Tim. International Adventures: German Popular Cinema and European Co-Productions in the 1960s. Berghahn Books, 2005.

External links 
 

1965 films
1965 Western (genre) films
German Western (genre) films
West German films
Films set in the 19th century
Films shot in Croatia
Films shot in Yugoslavia
Films shot in Bosnia and Herzegovina
Winnetou films
Films directed by Harald Philipp
Films produced by Horst Wendlandt
Works about petroleum
Constantin Film films
Yugoslav Western (genre) films
Films shot at Spandau Studios
1960s German films
1960s German-language films
Foreign films set in the United States